Frédéric Brun (born 18 August 1988) is a French former professional racing cyclist, who rode professionally between 2014 and 2016 for  and . He was named in the start list for the 2015 Tour de France.

Major results

2008
 9th Tour de Berne
2010
 10th Overall Tour des Pays de Savoie
2013
 1st Mountains classification Tour du Limousin
 10th Paris–Troyes
2015
 5th Overall Tour des Pays de Savoie
 8th Polynormande

References

External links
 
 

1988 births
Living people
French male cyclists
Sportspeople from Belfort
Cyclists from Bourgogne-Franche-Comté